TheNEWS Magazine is a daily news magazine published in Nigeria by the Independent Communications Network Limited (ICNL). It was founded in February 1993 by Bayo Onanuga and Babafemi Ojudu.

References 

1993 establishments in Nigeria
Magazines established in 1993
Magazines published in Nigeria